Col de la Pierre Saint-Martin  (elevation ) is a mountain pass on the France-Spain border in the western Pyrenees in the department of Pyrénées-Atlantiques (France) and Navarra (Spain). The climb from the Spanish side was used in the 2007 Tour de France.

Close to the summit of the pass, there is the ski station of Arette-Pierre-Saint-Martin.

In 2015, on Bastille Day, the tenth leg of the Tour climbed the Col in the other direction,  from Arette up to the village of Pierre Saint Martin, which hosted the end of a stage for the first time ever.

Every year on 13 July since 1375, the ceremony of the Tribute of the Three Cows takes place on the summit of the mountain pass.

Details of the climb 

The pass is situated south east of Oloron-Sainte-Marie. En route, the climb passes over the Col de Labays, the Pas de Guilhers and the Col du Soudet.

Tour de France 
The climb from the south featured in 2007 in the Tour de France for the first time on the  stage 16 from Orthez to Gourette–Col d'Aubisque. In 2015, the climb, coming from the north was featured as a stage finish for the first time on the  stage 10 from Tarbes.

Tour de France stage finishes

Passages in the Tour de France

References

External links
 
Detailed summary of climb

Mountain passes of Nouvelle-Aquitaine
Mountain passes of the Pyrenees
Mountain passes of Spain
France–Spain border crossings